Modern Love is a 1990 American comedy film written and directed by Robby Benson. The film stars Robby Benson, Karla DeVito, Rue McClanahan, Burt Reynolds, Frankie Valli, Kaye Ballard, Cliff Bemis, Louise Lasser and Lyric Benson. The film was released on April 20, 1990, by Triumph Films.

Plot
Comedy-drama about marriage following Greg, an anxious man dealing with the responsibilities of his life.

Cast    
Robby Benson as Greg
Karla DeVito as Billie
Rue McClanahan as Mrs. Evelyn Parker
Burt Reynolds as Colonel Frank Parker
Frankie Valli as Mr. Hoskins
Kaye Ballard as Receptionist
Cliff Bemis as Dirk Martin
Louise Lasser as Greg's Mom
Lyric Benson as Chloe
Debra Port as Annabell
Stan Brown as Dr. Reed
Lou Kaplan as Greg's dad
Beth Meadows as Mary Miller 
Sharyn Greene as Shayne
Libby Campbell as Mrs. Withers
Dacey Parker as Chloe, 3 years old
Jennifer Ray as Chloe, 25 years old
Bill Mould as Billie's uncle
George Altman as Cain
Ann Crawford Dreher as Ma Bell
Sarah Kimball as Jezebell
Karen Eterovich as Marabell
Ripley Thames as Peter
Cindy Ott as Kathy
Greg Benson as Jeff 
Claude Taylor III as Billie's cousin
Christina Schulze as Mr. Hoskins' secretary
James B. Holderman as Himself

References

External links
 
 

1990 films
American comedy films
1990 comedy films
Triumph Films films
Films directed by Robby Benson
1990s English-language films
1990s American films